Alvin Ailey Jr. (January 5, 1931 – December 1, 1989) was an American dancer, director, choreographer, and activist who founded the Alvin Ailey American Dance Theater (AAADT). He created AAADT and its affiliated Alvin Ailey American Dance Center (later Ailey School) as havens for nurturing Black artists and expressing the universality of the African-American experience through dance.

A gay man, his work fused theater, modern dance, ballet, and jazz with Black vernacular, creating hope-fueled choreography that continues to spread global awareness of Black life in America. Ailey's choreographic masterpiece Revelations is recognized as one of the most popular and most performed ballets in the world.

On July 15, 2008, the United States Congress passed a resolution designating AAADT a "vital American cultural ambassador to the World." That same year, in recognition of AAADT's 50th anniversary, then Mayor Michael Bloomberg declared December 4 "Alvin Ailey Day" in New York City, while then-Governor David Paterson honored the organization on behalf of New York State.

Early life and education
Born in Rogers, Texas, at the height of the Great Depression in the violently racist and segregated south, during his youth Ailey was barred from interacting with mainstream society. Abandoned by his father Alvin Ailey when he was three months old, Ailey and his mother, Lula Elizabeth, were forced to work in cotton fields and as domestics in white homes — the only employment available to them. As an escape, Ailey found refuge in the church, sneaking out at night to watch adults dance, and in writing a journal, a practice that he maintained his entire life. Even this could not shield him from a childhood spent moving from town to town as his mother sought employment, being abandoned with relatives whenever she took off on her own.

Looking for greater job prospects, Ailey's mother departed for Los Angeles in 1941. He arrived a year later, enrolling at George Washington Carver Junior High School, and then graduating into Thomas Jefferson High School. In 1946 he had his first experience with concert dance when he saw the Katherine Dunham Dance Company and Ballet Russe de Monte Carlo perform at the Los Angeles Philharmonic Auditorium. This awakened an until then unknown spark of joy within him, though he did not become serious about dance until 1949 when his classmate and friend Carmen De Lavallade dragged him to the Melrose Avenue studio of Lester Horton.

Ailey studied a wide range of dance styles and techniques — from ballet to Native American inspired movement studies — at Horton's school, which was one of the first racially integrated dance schools in the United States. Though Horton became his mentor, Ailey did not commit to dancing full-time; instead he pursued academic courses, studying romance languages and writing at UCLA. He continued these studies at San Francisco State in 1951. Living in San Francisco, he met Maya Angelou, then known as Marguerite Johnson, with whom he formed a nightclub act called "Al and Rita." Eventually, he returned to study dance with Horton in Los Angeles.

Career
He joined Horton's dance company in 1953, making his debut in Horton's Revue Le Bal Caribe. Horton died suddenly that same year in November from a heart attack, leaving the company without leadership. In order to complete the organization's pressing professional engagements, and because no one else was willing to, Ailey took over as artistic director and choreographer.

In 1954 De Lavallade and Ailey were recruited by Herbert Ross to join the Broadway show, House of Flowers. Ross had been hired to replace George Balanchine as the show's choreographer and he wanted to use the pair, who had become known as a famous dance team in Los Angeles, as featured dancers. The show's book was written and adapted by Truman Capote from one of his novellas with music from Harold Arlen and starred Pearl Bailey and Diahann Carroll.

Ailey and De Lavallade met Geoffrey Holder, who performed alongside them in the chorus, during the production. Holder married De Lavallade and became a life-long artistic collaborator with Ailey. After House of Flowers closed, Ailey appeared in Harry Belafonte's touring revue Sing, Man, Sing with Mary Hinkson as his dance partner, and the 1957 Broadway musical Jamaica, which starred Lena Horne and Ricardo Montalbán. Drawn to dance, but unable to find a choreographer whose work fulfilled him, Ailey started gathering dancers to perform his own unique vision of dance.

Alvin Ailey American Dance Theater

In 1958 Ailey founded the Alvin Ailey American Dance Theater to present his vision of honoring Black culture through dance. The company had its debut at the 92nd Street Y. The performance included Ailey's first masterpiece, Blues Suite, which followed men and women as they caroused and cavorted over the course of an evening while blues music played in the background until church bells began to ring, signalling a return to mundane life.

Also in 1960, Ailey premiered his most popular and critically acclaimed work, Revelations, again at the 92nd Street Y. In creating Revelations, Ailey drew upon his "blood memories" of growing up in Texas surrounded by Black people, the church, spirituals, and the blues. The ballet charts the full range of feelings, from the majestic "I Been ’Buked" to the rapturous "Wade in the Water," closing with the electrifying finale, "Rocka My Soul in the Bosom of Abraham."

After this performance, and despite their success, the Ailey company struggled to find consistent bookings. Though the US State Department sponsored AAADT's first international tour in 1962, which traveled across Asia — with followups to Senegal in 1966 and East & West Africa in 1967 — the company was able to book only a few performances per season in America. After a successful week-long engagement at the Billy Rose Theatre, the company was invited to become the resident company at Brooklyn Academy of Music.

The relationship did not go well and ended a few years later. Ailey struggled with the state department tours, which insisted on marketing the company as an "ethnic" company rather than a modern dance company, and were closely supervised by the FBI - the latter referred to Ailey's homosexuality as "lewd and criminal tendencies" and threatened his company with bankruptcy if he showed any signs of effeminate or homosexual behavior while on tour.

In 1970, with few bookings on the radar — and on the eve of a tour to Russia as part of a cultural exchange agreement — Ailey announced at a press conference that he was closing the company. In response, the State Department sponsored an Ailey tour of North Africa to tide things over. That August, the company toured to Russia where it was ecstatically received. Their performances were broadcast on Moscow television and seen by over 22 million viewers. On closing night, because the Russian audiences would not stop applauding, the company gave over 30 curtain calls. Returning home with news of this triumph, the company performed a two-week engagement at the ANTA Theater. By the end of the January 1971 performance, the entire run was sold out. After 13 years, Alvin Ailey American Dance Theatre was a monumental success. In August 1972 the company was briefly renamed Alvin Ailey City Center Dance Theater and became a resident company of New York City Center.

While Ailey choreographed more than 100 ballets for his dancers, he insisted that the company perform pieces by other choreographers rather than stand as a singular vehicle for his voice.

Though AAADT was formed to celebrate African American culture and to provide performances for black dancers, who were frequently denied opportunities due to racist mores of the time, Ailey proudly employed artists based solely on artistic talent and integrity, regardless of their background. In addition to his work as artistic director and choreographer with AADT, Ailey also choreographed ballets for other companies including American Ballet Theatre, Joffrey Ballet, Royal Danish Ballet, and The Metropolitan Opera. For American Ballet Theater, he created The River (1970), one of several choreographies he set to the jazz music of Duke Ellington.

The Ailey School
In 1969, Ailey founded the Alvin Ailey American Dance Center with the famed Martha Graham Dance Company principal and choreographer Pearl Lang as his co-director of the school. Their aim was to provide access to arts and dance to under-resourced communities. They started off in Brooklyn with 125 students. A year later the school relocated to Manhattan behind the Lincoln Center complex. In 1984, Denise Jefferson assumed directorship. Under her leadership, the school developed a Bachelor of Fine Arts Program in partnership with Fordham University in 1998.

The school was renamed The Ailey School in 1999. Several years later, the school moved into The Joan Weill Center for Dance. Following Jefferson's death in 2010, Tracy Inman and Melanie Person assumed stewardship of the school as co-directors of the school. In 2012, after leading Ailey 2 for 38 years, Sylvia Waters retired. The second company's resident choreographer and associate director Troy Powell took over her role as artistic director. With the addition of the Elaine Wynn and Family Education Wing, the Ailey school is still growing and is now the largest place in New York City committed to training dancers.

From her joining in 1965, the dancer Judith Jamison served as Ailey's muse. In 1971 she premiered Cry, which he dedicated to his mother and black women everywhere. She took over as artistic director following his death in 1989.

Other important figures in the company include Sylvia Waters, who in 1974, after performing with the company for six year was asked by Ailey to lead The Alvin Ailey Repertory Ensemble — a junior company, known today as Ailey 2, that prepares leading students for professional dance careers - and Masazumi Chaya, who danced with the company for 15 years then became rehearsal director, and was appointed associate artistic director in 1991.

Personal life
Ailey loathed the label "Black choreographer" and preferred being known simply as a choreographer. He was notoriously private about his life. Though gay, he kept his romantic affairs in the closet. Following the death of his friend Joyce Trisler, a failed relationship, and bouts of heavy drinking and cocaine use, Ailey suffered a mental breakdown in 1980. He was diagnosed as manic depressive, known today as bipolar disorder. During his rehabilitation, Judith Jamison served as co-director of AAADT.

Death
Ailey died from an AIDS-related illness on December 1, 1989, at the age of 58. He asked his doctor to announce that his death was caused by terminal blood dyscrasia in order to shield his mother from the stigma associated with HIV/AIDS.

Reception and legacy

Recognition and honors
1968: Guggenheim Fellowship for Creative Arts, US & Canada
1977: Spingarn Medal from the NAACP 
1992: Inducted into the National Museum of Dance and Hall of Fame
1989: Kennedy Center Honors
2012: Ailey crater on Mercury named in his honor
2012: Inducted into the Legacy Walk in 2012
2014: Posthumously received the Presidential Medal of Freedom from President Barack Obama.
 August 2019: Inducted in the Rainbow Honor Walk, a walk of fame in San Francisco's Castro neighborhood noting LGBTQ people who have "made significant contributions in their fields"
 2020: Figure-skating choreographer Rohene Ward and Olympic medallist Jason Brown co-choreographed a tribute to Ailey set to Nina Simone's version of "Sinnerman," which Brown competed in both the 2020–2021 and 2021–2022 seasons, including at the 2022 Winter Olympics.

After his death, Ailey’s personal papers were housed at the Black Archives of Mid-America in Kansas City, Missouri.

Documentary
In 2021, the documentary Ailey by director Jamila Wignot was released in the United States. Wignot first discovered the work of the Alvin Ailey American Dance Theater by attending a performance while she was a student at Wellesley College; in her documentary more than twenty years later, Alexandra Villarreal of The Guardian writes, "What emerges is a towering figure who won worldwide acclaim with art steeped in personal experience, yet was too afraid to openly share his full identity even in death."

Though Ailey's work has been met with popular and critical acclaim, there have been detractors of his theatrical style. Marcia Siegel accused the company of "selling soul," and of amplifying and transforming the emotivity characteristic of Martha Graham and his modern dance teachers into "metaphors of the American black experience" while creating a positive stereotype of "supremely physical, supremely sensitive beings" at the expense of genuineness."

Ailey responded to such criticism by stating, "The black pieces we do that come from blues, spirituals and gospels are part of what I am. They are as honest and truthful as we can make them. I'm interested in putting something on stage that will have a very wide appeal without being condescending; that will reach an audience and make it part of the dance; that will get everybody into the theater. If it's art and entertainment — thank God, that's what I want to be."

Associated people
In 1960, James Truitte joined the dance company, and later became an authority on Lester Horton's technique.

Works

Choreography
 Cinco Latinos, Alvin Ailey American Dance Theatre, Kaufmann Concert Hall, New York City, 1958?
 Blues Suite (also see below), Alvin Ailey American Dance Theatre, Kaufmann Concert Hall, 1958.
 Revelations, Alvin Ailey American Dance Theatre, Kaufmann ConcertHall, 1960
 Three for Now, Alvin Ailey American Dance Theatre, Clark Center, New York City, 1960.
 Knoxville: Summer of 1915, Alvin Ailey American Dance Theatre, Clark Center, 1960.
 (With Carmen De Lavallade) Roots of the Blues, Lewisohn Stadium, New York City, 1961.
 Hermit Songs, Alvin Ailey American Dance Theatre, Library of Congress, Washington, D.C., 1963.
 Ariadne, Harkness Ballet, Opera Comique, Paris, 1965.
 Macumba, Harkness Ballet, Gran Teatro del Liceo, Barcelona, Spain,1966, then produced as Yemanja, Chicago Opera House, 1967.
 Quintet, Alvin Ailey American Dance Theatre, Church Hill Theatre, Edinburgh Festival, Scotland, 1968, then Billy Rose Theatre, New York City, 1969.
 Masekela Langage, Alvin Ailey American Dance Theatre, American Dance Festival, New London, Connecticut, 1969, then Brooklyn Academy of Music, New York City, 1969.<ref>{{Cite news|url=https://www.nytimes.com/1969/11/21/archives/dance-militant-masekela-langage.html|title=Dance: Militant 'Masekela Langage|last=Kisselgoff|first=Anna|date=1969-11-21|work=The New York Times|access-date=2019-07-28|language=en-US|issn=0362-4331}}</ref>
 Streams, Alvin Ailey American Dance Theatre, Brooklyn Academy of Music, 1970.
 Gymnopedies, Alvin Ailey American Dance Theatre, Brooklyn Academy of Music, 1970.
 The River, American Ballet Theatre, New York State Theater, 1970.
 Flowers, Alvin Ailey American Dance Theatre, ANTA Theatre, 1971.
 Myth, Alvin Ailey American Dance Theatre, New York City Center, 1971.
 Choral Dances, Alvin Ailey American Dance Theatre, New York City Center, 1971.
 Cry, solo created for Judith Jamison, Alvin Ailey American Dance Theatre, New York City Center, 1971.
 Mingus Dances, Robert Joffrey Company, New York City Center, 1971.
 Mary Lou's Mass, Alvin Ailey American Dance Theatre, New York City Center, 1971.
 Song for You, solo created for Dudley Williams, Alvin Ailey American Dance Theatre, New York City Center, 1972.
 The Lark Ascending, Alvin Ailey American Dance Theatre, New York City Center, 1972.
 Love Songs, Alvin Ailey City Center Dance Theater, New York City Center, 1972.
 Shaken Angels, 10th New York Dance Festival, Delacorte Theatre, New York City, 1972.Sea Change, American Ballet Theatre, Kennedy Center Opera House, Washington, D.C., 1972, then New York City Center, 1973.Hidden Rites, Alvin Ailey City Center Dance Theater, New York City Center, 1973.Archipelago, 1971,The Mooche, 1975,Night Creature, 1975,Pas de "Duke", 1976,Memoria, 1979,Phases, 1980Landscape, 1981.Survivors, 1986.

Stage
Acting and dancing
(Broadway debut) House of Flowers, Alvin Theatre, New York City, 1954 – Actor and dancer.The Carefree Tree, 1955 – Actor and dancer.Sing, Man, Sing, 1956 – Actor and dancer.Show Boat, Marine Theatre, Jones Beach, New York, 1957 – Actor and dancer.Jamaica, Imperial Theatre, New York City, 1957 – Actor and lead dance.Call Me By My Rightful Name, One Sheridan Square Theatre, 1961 – Paul.Ding Dong Bell, Westport Country Playhouse, 1961 – Negro Political Leader.Blackstone Boulevard, Talking to You, produced as double-bill in 2 by Saroyan, East End Theatre, New York City, 1961–62.Tiger, Tiger, Burning Bright, Booth Theatre, 1962 – Clarence Morris.

Stage choreography
 Carmen Jones, Theatre in the Park, 1959.
 Jamaica, Music Circus, Lambertville, New Jersey, 1959.
 Dark of the Moon, Lenox Hill Playhouse, 1960.
 (And director) African Holiday (musical), Apollo Theatre, New York City, 1960, then produced at Howard Theatre, Washington, D.C., 1960.
 Feast of Ashes (ballet), Robert Joffrey Company, Teatro San Carlos, Lisbon, Portugal, 1962, then produced at New York City Center, 1971.
 Antony and Cleopatra (opera), Metropolitan Opera House, Lincoln Center, New York City, 1966.
 La Strada, first produced at Lunt-Fontanne Theatre, 1969.
Leonard Bernstein's Mass, Metropolitan Opera House, 1972, then John F. Kennedy delícia Center for the Performing Arts, Washington, D.C., and Philadelphia Academy of Music, both 1972.
 Carmen, Metropolitan Opera, 1972.
 Choreographed ballet, Lord Byron (opera; also see below), Juilliard School of Music, New York City, 1972.
 Four Saints in Three Acts, Piccolo Met, New York City, 1973.

Director
 (With William Hairston) Jerico-Jim Crow, The Sanctuary, New York City, 1964, then Greenwich Mews Theatre, 1968.

See also

Postmodern dance
20th century concert dance
List of dance companies

References
 Citations 

 Cited works 

 

External links

 Alvin Ailey American Dance Theater
 
 
 
 American Ballet Theater biography
 Kennedy Center biographyNPR: Holiday Dance at the Alvin Ailey Theater''
 Archive footage of Alvin Ailey Repertory Ensemble dancing Revelations in 1988 at Jacob's Pillow
 Archival footage of Matthew Rushing performing in Alvin Ailey's Revelations in 2007 at Jacob’s Pillow Dance Festival
 Archival footage of Ailey II performing in Alvin Ailey's Revelations in 1988 at Jacob's Pillow Dance Festival
 Archival footage of Dance Theatre of Harlem performing in Alvin Ailey's The Lark Ascending in 2013 at Jacob's Pillow Dance Festival
 Alvin Ailey at Find a Grave

1931 births
1989 deaths
20th-century African-American artists
20th-century American male artists
20th-century American LGBT people
African-American ballet dancers
African-American choreographers
African-American male dancers
AIDS-related deaths in New York (state)
American choreographers
American male ballet dancers
American male dancers
Burials at Rose Hills Memorial Park
Dancers from Texas
Deaths from pneumonia in New York City
Gay dancers
Kennedy Center honorees
LGBT African Americans
LGBT choreographers
LGBT people from New York (state)
LGBT people from Texas
Modern dance
Modern dancers
People from Rogers, Texas
People with bipolar disorder
Presidential Medal of Freedom recipients
Spingarn Medal winners